Jejuri can refer to:

Jejuri, a town in Maharashtra, India
Jejuri railway station
Jejuri (poem), a work by Arun Kolatkar